Rowlie Hutton is a Republican member of the Montana Legislature.  He was elected for Senate District 17, representing Havre, Montana, for the 2011 term.  On February 2, 2011 Hutton resigned effective the end of the current session to take a pastor position in Omaha, Nebraska.  Hutton volunteers for the Special Olympics and has participated in the Polar Plunge fundraiser for special needs children.

References

Living people
Year of birth missing (living people)
Republican Party Montana state senators
People from Havre, Montana
People from Blaine County, Montana